Steve French (September 24, 1959 – June 22, 2016) was an American baritone who was the emcee and owner of the Kingdom Heirs. Born in Mascot, Tennessee, French and his brother, Kreis, founded the group in 1981; both began performing musically at their church. He previously traveled with regional groups the Crystal River Boys and the King's Servants.

In 2002, French and his brother faced the task of replacing three key group members who had all resigned at the same time. They managed to keep the group a fan favorite. In addition to his past responsibilities with the Kingdom Heirs, he served on the board of directors for the National Quartet Convention. On June 22, 2016, French and girlfriend, Lindsey Hudson, jumped to their death from the New River Gorge Bridge in Fayette County, West Virginia. They both had active arrest warrants.

References 

1959 births
2016 deaths
Southern gospel performers
American gospel singers
People from Knox County, Tennessee